Messel is a surname. Notable people with the surname include:

Alfred Messel (1853–1909), German architect
Harry Messel (1922–2015), Canadian-born Australian physicist
Oliver Messel (1904–1978), English artist and stage designer
Syvert Tobiassen Messel (1897–1978), Norwegian politician